In This Defiance is the second full-length album release by California hardcore band Strife.

Legacy and reception 
The album proved to be the bands' defining moment, as it continuously gained recognition over the years. It was ranked 7th among the Top 10 most Underrated Hardcore Albums by Metal Hammer magazine, and AllMusic stated that this album was when "Strife finally hit everything just right. Their sound is big and full, yet almost clinically tight; the tempos are brisk, sometimes headlong." Canadian straight-edge metalcore band In This Defiance, active from 2005-2007, named themselves after this album and cited it as a major influence.

In 2017, the album was reissued on vinyl with a limited run of only 100 copies through guitarist Andrew Kline's own record label WAR Records. It was subsequently re-released on vinyl by Victory Records in 2020. In 2018, Strife performed the album in its entirety at a select run of concerts.

Track listing

Personnel
Strife
 Todd Turnham - guitar 
 Andrew Kline - guitar
 Rick Rodney - vocals
 Sid Niesen - drums
 Chad Peterson - bass

Additional musicians
 Igor Cavalera - additional drums
 Chino Moreno - additional vocals (on "Will to Die")
 Dino Cazares - additional guitar and background vocals
 Tony Moore - background vocals
 Ryan Cox - background vocals
 Jesse Austin - background vocals
 Justin "Gordo" Dedda - background vocals
 John Turnham - background vocals
 Dom Brooklyn House - background vocals
 Dave STS - background vocals
 Mark Aiken - background vocals
 Darren Doane - background vocals
 Erin Smith - background vocals
 Jen Eisle - background vocals
 Vic Galindo - background vocals
 Ian Ghent - background vocals
 Bobby Canaday - background vocals
 David Couzens - background vocals
 Zack Cordner - background vocals
 Dan Rawe - background vocals
 Jeff Moore  - background vocals
 Weddy Moore - background vocals
 Aaron Bruno - background vocals
 John Monroy - background vocals
 Ben Read - background vocals
 Dirty Ass Dan - background vocals
 Party Up - background vocals
 Stacie - background vocals
 Nick Johnson - background vocals

Production
 Dave Jagosz - recording
 Billy "the Kid" - engineering
 Bob Malrlette - mixing and mastering
 Ken Koroshetz - engineering
 Pat Sulivan - mastering
 Shuji Kobayashi - booklet photography
 OLECHR. Petterson - CD face and tray photography
 Ron Platzer - CD face and tray photography

References

1997 albums
Strife (band) albums